Jehona Mehmeti is a Swiss football midfielder currently playing for FC Yverdon Féminin in the Nationalliga A. She is a member of the Swiss national team since debuting at 19 in 2010, and played the 2010 U-20 World Cup as a junior international.

References

1990 births
Living people
Swiss women's footballers
Switzerland women's international footballers
Women's association football midfielders
BSC YB Frauen players
FC Basel Frauen players
Swiss Women's Super League players

FFC Zuchwil 05 players